Alexander Moiseevich Gorodnitsky (born March 20, 1933) is a well-known Soviet and Russian bard and poet. Professionally, he is a geologist and oceanographer. Gorodnitsky is an author of over 250 scientific publications on geophysics and tectonics of ocean bottom. He was awarded the honorary title of "Merited figure of sciences of Russian Federation" (2005). One of these songs, "Atlanes Hold the Heavens" (Russian: "Атланты держат небо"), is the unofficial anthem of Saint Petersburg. Asteroid No. 5988 and a pass in the Sayan Mountains were named after Alexander Gorodnitsky. The song "Atlanes Hold the Heavens" is the official anthem of the Hermitage Museum.

Early life

Gorodnitsky was born on 20 March 1933 in Leningrad to a Russian Jewish family. His father was an engineer who worked in the printing industry. His mother, in her youth, was a school maths teacher, then worked as corrector and editor of sailing directions.

Gorodnitsky survived the Siege of Leningrad during Second World War. In 1951, he graduated from high school and entered the Faculty of Geophysics of the Leningrad Mining Institute, which he graduated in 1957 with specialist degree.

Academic career 
From 1957 until 1972 Gorodnitsky worked in the Research institute for Geology of Arctic (its current name is All-Russian Research Institute for Geology and Mineral Resources of the World Ocean named after academician I.S. Gramberg). He has participated in many geological expeditions. Gorodnitsky is one of the discoverers of the Igarskoye copper deposit (1962).

Since 1962, he has participated in maritime geophysical expeditions. Gorodnitsky is one of the authors of new ocean's electric field measurement method (1967). In collaboration with V.D. Fedorov and A.N. Paramonov he discovered the bioelectric effect of phytoplankton (1967). In 1968, he became a Candidate of Sciences (thesis on "The application of magnetometry and electrometry for the ocean bottom exploration").

From 1969 until 1972 Gorodnitsky headed the Laboratory of Marine Geophysics of the Research institute for Geology of Arctic. In 1972, Gorodnitsky moved from Leningrad to Moscow and started working for the Research Institute of Oceanology named after P.P. Shirshov as a principal researcher. In 1982, he became a Doctor of Sciences in geological and mineralogical sciences (thesis on "The structure of oceanic lithosphere and underwater mountain building"). In 1991, Gorodnitsky was given the highest academic rank of the professor. He authored original model of petromagnetic structure of the Mid-ocean ridge zones (1997).

Gorodnitsky was at the drifting station at the North Pole (1964) and in Antarctica (1973). In 1982 and 1984, he took part in expeditions devoted to the search for the legendary Atlantis at the Ampère Seamount in the North Atlantic.

Gorodnitsky's research included numerous dives on bathyscaphes, starting from Hermit Atoll in Papua New Guinea in 1978. In 1988, during an expedition on the research ship Akademik Mstislav Keldysh in the North Atlantic on the deep-sea apparatus Mir (submersible), he dived to a depth of 4.5 kilometers.

Poet and singer-songwriter 

Gorodnitsky's first songs appeared during his expedition in 1953. For a long time his songs were distributed via samizdat tape recordings, and often performed by other singers. Like Alexander Galich, and unlike other bards, Gorodnitsky composed and sang his songs a cappella for several decades; later, he started playing the guitar. Most of his songs are based on his personal experiences. In concert, he usually performs with a professional guitarist accompanying him.

In 1972, Alexander Gorodnitsky was admitted to the Union of Soviet Writers on the recommendations of famous poets Boris Slutsky, David Samoilov, and Vadim Shefner.

In the opinion literary critics:
"The art of Alexander Gorodnitsky is definitely a most remarkable phenomenon of both guitar poetry and the wider Russian literary culture of the 20th century. Having undergone a nearly 50-year-long evolution, it now presents an organic synthesis of the poetic word with profound philosophical, historical, and scientific intuition to embody in its multi-genre creative system the essential qualities of the modern worldview".

Poems and songs by Alexander Gorodnitsky have been translated into English, Bulgarian, Hebrew, Spanish, German, Polish, French, Czech and other languages. They have also been included in school curricula.  

Gorodnitsky is acknowledged to be one of the founders of the bard songs genre in Soviet Union. His most popular songs are following: "Atlanes Hold the Heavens", "Near the Pillars of Hercules", "To the mainland", "Blue sky above Canada", "French ambassador's wife", "Snow", "Riffles", "The song of polar pilots". He is an author of over 60 books poems, songs and other literary works.

Many of Alexander Gorodnitsky poems and songs are dedicated to Germany: "Stuttgart" (1998), "Neva-Elbe" (2000), "German castles" (2003), "Johann Sebastian Bach" (2018), "Lüneburg" (2019) and others.

He was awarded the honorary title of "Merited figure of arts of Russian Federation" (2013).

Albums 

 «Русские барды. Александр Городницкий» («Имка-Пресс», Париж, 1977).
 «Атланты» («Мелодия», Ленинград, 1987), («Мелодия», Москва, 1987).
 «Берег» (1988).
 «Около площади» (1993).
 «За тех, кто на Земле» (1995).
 «Давай поедем в Царское Село» (1997).
 «Вперёдсмотрящий» (1996).
 «Система Декарта» (1999).
 «На материк» (1998).
 «Как медь умела петь…» (1997).
 «За шпилей твоих окоём» (2003).
 «Александр Городницкий» (двойной альбом, 2002).
 «Двадцать первый тревожный век» (2003).
 «Уйти на судне» (2005).
 «Гадание по ладони» (2003).
 «Река времён» (2008).
 «Навстречу судьбе» (2009).
 «От Оренбурга до Петербурга» (2009).
 «Новая Голландия» (2009).
 «Глобальное потепление» (2012).
 «Почему расстались» (2013).
 «У Геркулесовых столбов» (2013).
 «Детям» (2014).
 «Споём, ребята, вместе» (2014).
 «Давайте верить в чудеса» (2015).
 «Перезагрузка» (2017).
 «Октава» (2018).
 «Книжечки на полке» (2019).
 «Блокадный метроном» (2019).
 «Пока звенит струна» (2020).
 «Бухта Наталья» (двойной альбом, 2022).
 «Лебединая гавань» (2022). The songs were written in 2020-2022. The song «Swans Harbor» (Russian: «Лебединая гавань») is dedicated to Hamburg.

Books 

 Атланты: Стихи. М., Л.: Сов. писатель, 1967.
 Новая Голландия: Стихи. Л.: Лениздат, 1971.
 Берег: Стихи. М.: Сов. писатель, 1984.
 Полночное солнце: Стихи. М.: Сов. писатель, 1990.
 Перелетные ангелы: Стихи и песни. М.: Интербук, Свердловск: Старт, 1991.
 Острова в океане: Песни. М.: МГЦАП, 1993.
 Созвездие Рыбы: Стихи. СПб.: Девятый вал, 1993.
 Остров Израиль: Стихи и песни. Иерусалим: 1995.
 Времена года: Поэмы. М.: Сампо, 1996.
 Ледяное стремя: Стихи. СПб.: Звезда, 1997.
 Атланты держит небо. Иерусалим: Беседер, 1999.
 Имена вокзалов. - СПб.: Петрополь, 1999.
 Стихи и песни. Избранное. СПб.: Лимбус Пресс, 1999.
 На материк. М.: Вагант-Москва, 1999.
 Давай поедем в Царское Село. СПб.: Бояныч, 1999.
 За временем вдогонку. М.: Вагант, 1999.
 Васильевский остров. М.: Вагант-Москва, 1999.
 Бульварное кольцо. М.: Вагант-Москва, 1999.
 Зелёный луч. М.: Вагант-Москва, 1999.
 Сочинения. М.: Локид, 2000.
 «Когда судьба поставлена на карту». М.: Эксмо, 2001.
 «И жить еще надежде». М.: Вагриус, 2001.
 Атланты. СПб.: Композитор, 2004.
 Снег. Екатеринбург: У-Фактория, 2004.
 Родство по слову. Иерусалим: Беседер, 2005.
 Гадание по ладони. СПб.: Фонд русской поэзии, 2006.
 Время для хора. М.: Радуга, 2006.
 Коломна. СПб.: Фонд русской поэзии, 2008.
 Избранное. СПб.: Вита Нова, 2008.
 Избранное. Новосибирск: Талер-Пресс, 2008 (Том 1), 2010 (Том 2).
 Ночной поезд. СПб.: Фонд русской поэзии, 2009.
 Легенда о доме. Избранные стихи и песни. М.: Азбука-классика, 2010.
 Бакинская тетрадь. Баку: Изд. Д. Имамвердиев и клуб АП Баку, 2012.
 Почему расстались. СПб.: Петрополис, 2012.
 Корабли у пирса. СПб.: Фонд русской поэзии, 2012.
 Песни разных лет. Харьков: Золотые страницы, 2013.
 Царскосельская тетрадь. СПб: Серебряный век, 2013.
 Атланты: Моя кругосветная жизнь. М.: Яуза, Эксмо, 2013.
 Атланты держат небо: Стихотворения. Песни. Поэмы. СПб.: Лениздат, 2013.
 Детям. Харьков: Золотые страницы, 2014.
 Улица времени. СПб: Фонд русской поэзии, 2014.
 Двадцать первый тревожный век: Стихи. СПб.: Лимбус Пресс, 2014.
 Тайны и мифы науки. В поисках истины. М.: Яуза, Эксмо, 2014.
 Будет помниться война. М.: Наша школа, 2015.
 Стихи и песни. М.: Эксмо, 2015.
 Стихи и песни Двадцать первого века. М.: Эксмо, 2015.
 Давайте верить. СПб: Фонд русской поэзии, 2015.
 Определение дома: Избранные стихотворения и песни. СПб.: Вита Нова, 2016.
 Осеннее равноденствие. СПб.: Фонд русской поэзии, 2016.
 Стихи и песни. М.: Яуза, Эксмо, 2016.
 Новые стихи и песни. М.: Яуза, Эксмо, 2016.
 Полное собрание песен. М., Яуза, 2017.
 Ступени Эрмитажа. СПб.: Фонд русской поэзии, 2018.
 Различие в возрасте. СПб.: Фонд русской поэзии, 2018.
 Моя маму зовут Рахиль: Стихи и песни. СПб.: Издание Бориса Бейлина, 2019.
 Между сушей и водой. СПб.: Фонд русской поэзии, 2020.
 Океан времен: Стихи и песни о русской и мировой истории. СПб., 2020.
 «Атланты держат небо...»: Воспоминания старого островитянина. М.: Яуза, 2020.
 Продление жизни. СПб.: Фонд русской поэзии, 2021.
 На ускользающей Земле. СПб.: Фонд русской поэзии, 2021.
 Дорога к Пушкину: Стихи и песни, посвященные великому русскому поэту. М.: Издательство «Академическая наука», 2021.
 Разведенные мосты. М.: Издательство «Академическая наука», 2021.
 Избранное: Стихи, песни, поэмы. М.: Яуза, 2021.
 Вечерняя тень. М.: Издательство «Академическая наука», 2022.
 Московское время: Стихи и песни о Москве. М.: Издательство «Академическая наука», 2022.

TV Programs and Documentaries
 2003 to 2012 – author and presenter of The Atlantes: Quest for the Truth, a popular science show on Kultura TV Channel (42 episodes).
 2008 – In Search of Yiddish. Authors: Alexander Gorodnitsky, Natalia Kasperovich, Yury Khaschevatsky, Semyon Fridlyand.
The film deals with the tragic fate of Yiddish, the language of European Jewry, which was practically obliterated during the Holocaust. On the eve of his 75th birthday, the well-known poet and scientist Alexander Gorodnitsky travels to the Belarussian city of Mogilev where his parents were born and raised and where, in the autumn of 1941, the Nazis murdered all his relatives. He proceeds to other towns and villages of Belarus trying to find any surviving relatives and traces of Yiddish culture. Continuing the search, Gorodnitsky flies over to Israel where his son and granddaughters live. The viewer learns about the stories of various people onscreen as well as the dramatic decline of the once-great Yiddish culture that has given the world Sholem Aleichem, Shmuel Galkin, Solomon Mikhoels, Marc Chagall, and Chaim Soutine. The film contains unique documentary footage. The songs and poetry featured here were written and recorded by Alexander Gorodnitsky specially for this project, among them the fragments of the new epic poem In Search of Yiddish. In 2009, In Search of Yiddish was named the best foreign documentary in the Culture category at the New York International Independent Film and Video Festival.

 2009 – Atlantes Hold the Heavens, a 34-episode autobiographical documentary. Authors: Alexander Gorodnitsky, Natalia Kasperovich.
In this documentary, Alexander Gorodnitsky recalls his pre-WWII childhood, the war and the besieged Leningrad, student years, long-term expeditions in the Arctic and the World Ocean, trips to distant countries, the emergence of guitar poetry in Russia, and its departed poets and bards. A substantial portion of the series is devoted to the 1960s era, the Soviet “Sixtiers” generation, and much else. The film features poems and songs by Alexander Gorodnitsky in his own renditions, which create a poetic background for the narrative. Filming took place between 2005 and 2009 in Russia, Belarus, Ukraine, Azerbaijan, Israel, Germany, France, USA, Canada, Australia, and New Zealand. The film makes use of rare documentary footage as well as numerous video and photo materials from private archives in Russia and across the world. In 2012, the authors won Tsarskoye Selo Arts Award.

Subsequently, the same team of authors released further documentaries: And Hope Will Go On Living (2012), My Petersburg (2013), The Legends and Myths of Alexander Gorodnitsky (2014), and Portraits on the Wall  (2015). In 2015, Portraits on the Wall also won the Tsarskoye Selo Arts Award.

 The Legends and Myths of Alexander Gorodnitsky consists of three parts: Atlantis in the Deep, Biblical Cataclysms, and End Times and Geoscience. In this documentary, the scientist and poet Alexander Gorodnitsky discusses the best known ancient as well as the rather popular contemporary myths – including anthropogenic climate change and the ozone hole – from the perspective of modern science. Gorodnitsky’s poems and songs create a poetic background for the narrative. Among the film’s subjects are the Bible’s prophet Moses and Lot with his daughters,  ancient Greek philosophers Plato, Socrates, and Aristotle, scientists Charles Darwin, Georges Cuvier and Evgeny Shakhnovich, famous ocean explorer Jacques-Yves Cousteau and historian Natan Eidelman, poets Homer and Pushkin, politician Al Gore, and many others. The film makes use of scientific illustrative material along with photos and videos from private archives both in Russia and across the world. Authors: Alexander Gorodnitsky, Natalia Kasperovich, 2014.

 2020 – String and Word, three-part documentary about the history of the bard song in the USSR. Authors: Alexander Gorodnitsky, Natalia Kasperovich.

Political views and social activity
Gorodnitsky opposed the annexation of Crimea by the Russian Federation and had signed the open letter against war, political self-isolation of Russia, restoration of totalitarianism.

References

External links

 Официальный сайт Александра Городницкого — official site
 Personalities of Saint-Petersburg — biography  and photographs
 Alexander Gorodnitsky’s bio

1933 births
Living people
20th-century Russian male writers
Honoured Scientists of the Russian Federation
Russian bards
Russian Jews
Russian male poets
Russian male singer-songwriters
Russian television presenters
Saint Petersburg Mining University alumni
Soviet male singer-songwriters
Soviet male writers
Soviet musicians
Soviet poets
Soviet songwriters
Writers from Saint Petersburg
20th-century Russian male singers
20th-century Russian singers
Soviet Jews
Russian Academy of Natural Sciences
Soviet geologists
Soviet oceanographers